The School of Environmental Science and Management (SESAM) is one of the eleven degree-granting units of the University of the Philippines at Los Baños (UPLB). It was created in 1977 in response to calls for a multidisciplinary effort to address environmental degradation amid economic development. Then known as the Program on Environmental Science and Management, it was lodged under the Office of the Chancellor with initial funding support from the Ford Foundation.

It began offering the Master of Environmental Studies program in 1984 and pioneered development and testing methodologies and approaches for sustainable management of upland resources, which include the following: Agroecosystem Analysis, Rapid Rural Systems Appraisal (RRSA), Assisted Natural Regeneration (ANR), Strategic Environmental Planning and Modelling and Environmental Impact Assessment.

Degree Programs

PhD Environmental Science
MS Environmental Science

References
  School of Environmental Science and Management

 University of the Philippines Los Baños

Environment
Educational institutions established in 1977
1977 establishments in the Philippines